, also known as Tsuchida Gozen, was a Japanese noblewoman and the mother of Oda Nobunaga, a major daimyō and politician of the Sengoku period regarded as the first "Great Unifier" of Japan.

Biography

Dota Gozen's origins are unknown, including her date and location of birth, her ancestry, and her real name. Gozen is assumed to be the daughter of Dota Masahisa, also known as Tsuchida Masahisa, a samurai possibly descended from the Rokkaku clan, but this is unconfirmed. Gozen was married to Oda Nobuhide, a deputy shugo of Owari Province and the head of the powerful Oda clan. Gozen the mother of Nobunaga, his three brothers, Nobuyuki, Nobukane and Hidetaka; and two of his sisters, Oinu and Oichi.

According to rumors, Gozen did not like her eldest son Nobunaga, notorious in Owari for his eccentric and unconventional behavior, and instead preferred his well-mannered younger brother, Nobuyuki. When Nobuhide died in 1551, Gozen moved to Suemori Castle to live with Nobuyuki, and supported him in the succession crisis that occurred. Although Nobunaga was the legitimate heir as head of the Oda clan, Nobuyuki and other family members plotted against his succession. When Nobuyuki attempted to usurp Nobunaga but failed, Gozen stepped in and asked Nobunaga to take mercy on his brother, which he accepted and turned his attention to other rivals. However, Nobuyuki eventually tried to usurp Nobunaga again and, this time, Nobunaga killed him and destroyed Suemori Castle in the process. Gozen survived both Nobunaga and her grandson Oda Nobutada after their death in the Honno-ji Incident in 1582.

Gozen spent her later life with Nobukane at Tsu Castle until her death on 26 February 1594, and is buried at Shitennō-ji located in modern-day Tsu, Mie Prefecture.

Family
Father: Dota Masahisa
Husband: Oda Nobuhide (1510–1551)
Sons:
Oda Nobunaga (1534–1582)
Oda Nobuyuki (1536–1557)
Oda Nobukane (1548–1614)
Oda Hidetaka (died 1555)
Daughters:
Oichi (1547–1583)
Oinu (died 1582)

1594 deaths
16th-century Japanese people
16th-century Japanese women
Oda clan
Year of birth unknown